Lyudmyla Kichenok and Nadiya Kichenok were the defending champions, but both players chose not to participate.

Séverine Beltrame and Julie Coin won the title defeating Justyna Jegiołka and Diāna Marcinkēviča in the final 7–5, 6–4.

Seeds

Draw

Draw

References
 Main Draw

Open GDF Suez de Touraine - Doubles